Do It for Love may refer to:

 Do It for Love (Hall & Oates album), 2003
 "Do It for Love" (Hall & Oates song)
 "Do It for Love" (Marty Balin song), 1983
 Do It for Love (Alesha Dixon album), 2015
 "Do It for Love", a song by Sheena Easton from the 1985 album Do You